Giorgi Melikishvili (December 30, 1918 – March 27, 2002) was a Georgian historian known for his fundamental works in the history of Georgia, Caucasia and the Middle East. He earned international recognition for his research on Urartu.

He was born in Tbilisi and graduated in 1939, from the Tbilisi State University and earned a professor’s degree (1956). From 1954 to 1988, he chaired the Department of Ancient History at the Institute of the History of Georgia. From 1965 to 1999, he directed this Institute and remained its Honorary Director until his death.  He was also the first Soviet historian to be awarded a Lenin Prize.

He probed ancient Georgia’s connection to the Anatolian and Mesopotamian worlds and made an invaluable contributions to the studies of Urartu. His Russian-language К истории древней Грузии (Towards the History of Ancient Georgia; 1959)  to this day remains a standard reference in the ancient history of Georgia. Some of Melikishvili's most influential essays were published, in the early 2000s, in the collection Researches in the Ancient History of Georgia, Caucasia and the Near East (ძიებანი საქართველოს, კავკასიისა და ახლო აღმოსავლეთის ძველი ისტორიის დარგში).

Melikishvili became a member of the Georgian National Academy of Sciences in 1960.

Notes

References 
 Гамкрелидзе Т. В., Гиоргадзе Г. Г. Памяти Георгия Александровича Меликишвили // Вестник древней истории, 2003, № 3.

1918 births
2002 deaths
20th-century historians from Georgia (country)
Lenin Prize winners
Writers from Tbilisi
Orientalists from Georgia (country)
Soviet historians
Members of the Georgian National Academy of Sciences